Joy Spring is a live album by jazz guitarist Joe Pass that was recorded in 1964 for Pacific Jazz Records, but not released until 1981 under the Blue Note label by Liberty records.

Reception

Writing for Allmusic, music critic Scott Yanow wrote of the album, "The group stretches out on five standards (the renditions are 6 1/2-10 1/2 minutes apiece) but never runs out of inventive ideas. Easily recommended."

Track listing
"Joy Spring" (Clifford Brown) – 8:39
"Sometime Ago" (Sergio Mihanovich) – 6:34
"The Night Has a Thousand Eyes" (Buddy Bernier, Jerry Brainin) – 6:58
"Relaxin' at Camarillo" (Charlie Parker) – 10:29
"There Is No Greater Love" (Isham Jones, Marty Symes) – 9:02

Personnel
 Joe Pass – guitar
 Mike Wofford – piano
 Jim Hughart – bass
 Colin Bailey – drums

References

Joe Pass albums
1964 live albums
Pacific Jazz Records live albums
Live bebop albums